Caldes de Montbui in Catalan or Caldas de Montbui in Spanish, is a Spanish town and municipality in the comarca of the Vallès Oriental in Catalonia. It is situated in the upper valley of the Caldes river, and the highest point of the municipality is the peak of el Farell at 816 m. It lies about 30 km from Barcelona and it part of its metropolitan area.

The hot springs have been exploited since Roman times, and the remnants of the Roman baths and other Roman buildings can still be seen. The source of la Font del Lleó ("Lion Springs") in the main square emerges at more than 70 °C (158 °F). The town conserves parts of its medieval fortifications and the Torre de la Presó (prison). The hermitage of la Mare de Déu del Remei dates from the sixteenth century, as does the church of Santa Maria with its baroque entrance. The roman church of Sant Sebastià de Montmajor, in the village of the same name at the extreme north-west of the municipality, is particularly well preserved.

The artist Manolo Hugué lived and worked in Caldes de Montbui, and his house has been converted into a museum displaying both his works and those of other artists. The town also has an archeological museum and the Delger museum of furniture, paintings and sculptures.

Continuing in this artistic tradition is the master landscape painter Ramon Vilanova, a native son of the city and lifetime resident.

Climate

Demography

Note 
  Caldes de Montbui became part of the Vallès Oriental in the comarcal revision of 1990: previously it formed part of the Vallès Occidental.

References 

 Panareda Clopés, Josep Maria; Rios Calvet, Jaume; Rabella Vives, Josep Maria (1989). Guia de Catalunya, Barcelona: Caixa de Catalunya.  (Spanish).  (Catalan).

External links 

  
 Government data pages 

Spa towns in Catalonia
Municipalities in Vallès Oriental
Populated places in Vallès Oriental